Ilídio Tomé Alves Machado (born 17 December 1914, date of death unknown) co-founded the Popular Movement for the Liberation of Angola (MPLA) with Viriato da Cruz, Mário Pinto de Andrade, and Lúcio Lara on December 10, 1956. He served as the MPLA's first President from 1956 until his arrest in 1959. Agostinho Neto replaced him. Born in Novo Redondo, Machado is a member of the Kimbundu tribe.

References

External links
Mention of Ilídio Machado's death 

1914 births
Year of death missing
People from Cuanza Sul Province
Angolan communists
MPLA politicians